The Windmill Palm Grove is a 2005 South Korean melodrama film starring Kim Min-jong and Kim Yoo-mi, and written and directed by Jonathan Yu.

Plot

Cast
 Kim Min-jong as Kim In-seo 
 Kim Yoo-mi as Hwa-yeon/Jung-soon
 Jo Eun-sook as Shim Bong-ae
 Kim Yeong-gi as Sang-bong, Jung-soon's father
 Lee Ah-hyun as Choi Sung-joo
 Lee Geung-young as Deep-sea fishing boat captain Choi

Awards and nominations

References

External links
 
 
 

2005 films
2000s Korean-language films
South Korean drama films
2000s South Korean films